Sevali may refer to:
 Sevaldi, Iran
 Vaishali district, India